Graticule may refer to:

 An oscilloscope graticule scale 
 The reticle pattern in an optical instrument
 Graticule (cartography), a grid of lines on a map

See also 
 Grid (disambiguation)